Spodnje Dobrenje is a dispersed settlement in the Municipality of Pesnica in northeastern Slovenia. It lies in the Slovene Hills. The area is part of the traditional region of Styria. The municipality is now included in the Drava Statistical Region.

The A1 motorway runs through the entire length of the settlement.

References

External links
Spodnje Dobrenje on Geopedia

Populated places in the Municipality of Pesnica